{{DISPLAYTITLE:5-HT4 receptor}}

5-Hydroxytryptamine receptor 4 is a protein that in humans is encoded by the HTR4 gene.

Function 

This gene is a member of the family of human serotonin receptors, which are G protein-coupled receptors that stimulate cAMP production in response to serotonin (5-hydroxytryptamine). The gene product is a glycosylated transmembrane protein that functions in both the peripheral and central nervous system to modulate the release of various neurotransmitters. Multiple transcript variants encoding proteins with distinct C-terminal sequences have been described, but the full-length nature of some transcript variants has not been determined.

Location 
The receptor is located in the alimentary tract, urinary bladder, heart and adrenal gland as well as the central nervous system (CNS).
In the CNS the receptor appears in the putamen, caudate nucleus, nucleus accumbens, globus pallidus, and substantia nigra, and to a lesser extent in the neocortex, raphe, pontine nuclei, and some areas of the thalamus.
It has not been found in the cerebellum.

Isoforms
Internalization is isoform-specific.

Ligands
Several drugs that act as 5-HT4 selective agonists have recently been introduced into use in both scientific research and clinical medicine. Some drugs that act as 5-HT4 agonists are also active as 5-HT3 antagonists, such as mosapride, metoclopramide, renzapride, and zacopride, and so these compounds cannot be considered highly selective. Research in this area is ongoing. Amongst these agonists prucalopride has >150-fold higher affinity for 5-HT4 receptors than for other receptors.

SB-207,145 radiolabeled with carbon-11 is used as a radioligand for 5-HT4 in positron emission tomography pig
and human
studies.

Agonists 
 BIMU-8
 Cisapride
 CJ-033,466 - partial agonist
 ML-10302
 Mosapride
 Prucalopride
 Renzapride
 RS-67506
 RS-67333 - partial agonist
 SL65.0155 - partial agonist
 Tegaserod
 Zacopride
 Metoclopramide
 Sulpiride
 Naronapride

Antagonists 
l-lysine
 Piboserod
 GR-113,808 (1-methyl-1H-indole-3-carboxylic acid, [1-[2-[(methylsulfonyl)amino]ethyl]-4-piperidinyl]methyl ester)
 GR-125,487
 RS-39604 (1-[4-Amino-5-chloro-2-(3,5-dimethoxyphenyl)methyloxy]-3-[1-[2-methylsulphonylamino]piperidin-4-yl]propan-1-one)
 SB-203,186
 SB-204,070
([Methoxy-11C]1-butylpiperidin-4-yl)methyl 4-amino-3-methoxybenzoate
 Chamomile (ethanol extract)

See also 
 5-HT receptor
 5-HT1 receptor
 5-HT2 receptor
 5-HT3 receptor
 5-HT5 receptor
 5-HT6 receptor
 5-HT7 receptor

References

Further reading 

 Licht CL, 2009, Changes in the 5-HT4 receptor in animal models of depression and antidepressant treatment, PhD thesis, University of Copenhagen.

External links 
 
 

Biology of bipolar disorder
Serotonin receptors